Club Deportivo América, commonly known as América de Quito, is a football club based in Quito, Ecuador. A top-level club in Ecuador for decades, they were relegated to the second division in 1988 and later to the country's third-tier Segunda Categoría. In 2018, they returned to the top flight, but were again relegated a year later.

Achievements

National
Campeonato Ecuatoriano de Fútbol Serie A
Runner-up (2): 1969, 1971
Campeonato Ecuatoriano de Fútbol Serie B
Winner (1): 1978 E2
Runner-up (4): 1974 E1, 1976 E2, 1982 E2, 2018
Campeonato de Pichincha (since 1967)
Champion (4): 2001, 2002, 2003, 2004
Runner-up (2): 2005, 2016
Campeonato Professional Interandino
Runner-up (1): 1962

International
Performance in CONMEBOL competitions:

2 Copa Libertadores: 1970, 1972 - First Round.

Statistics
In Serie A (up to 2018)
Seasons: 22
Matches played: 616
Wins: 187
Draws: 176
Losses: 253
Goals for: 705
Goals against: 816
All-time position: 14th

Current squad
As of March 27, 2019.

Football clubs in Ecuador
Football clubs in Quito
Association football clubs established in 1939
1939 establishments in Ecuador